The Burnside Bridge is a 1926-built bascule bridge that spans the Willamette River in Portland, Oregon, United States, carrying Burnside Street. It is the second bridge at the same site to carry that name. It was added to the National Register of Historic Places in November 2012.

Design
The bridge was designed by Ira G. Hedrick and Robert E. Kremers, incorporating a bascule lift mechanism designed by Joseph Strauss.

The deck is made of concrete, which contributes to its being one of the heaviest bascule bridges in the United States. The counterweights, housed inside the two piers, weigh . The lifting is normally controlled by the Hawthorne Bridge operator, but an operator staffs the west tower during high river levels. As of 2005, the bridge opened for river traffic an average of 35 times a month.

The bridge provides shelter for the initially unauthorized Burnside Skatepark under the east end. On weekends, the Portland Saturday Market was held mostly under the bridge's west end for many years. The market was reoriented in 2009, but the Burnside Bridge continues to provide shelter for a few vendor stalls at the market's northern end.

History
In 1891, Burnside Street was renamed from "B" street to take the name of Dan Wyman Burnside, a local businessman who was a proponent of the 1866 dredging of the Willamette River.  Construction of the original Burnside Bridge began in November 1892, and the bridge opened on July 4, 1894. It was a swing-span truss bridge made of wrought iron and steel.

The replacement was part of a $4.5 million bond that also included the construction of the Ross Island and Sellwood bridges. The public would later learn that the 1924 contract was given for $500,000 more than the lowest bid. Having moved the bridge location to profit by selling their land, three Multnomah County commissioners were recalled as a result of the scandal, and a new engineering company assumed control of the project. The Ku Klux Klan had backed the commissioners and enabled their system of kickbacks and grafts; the ensuing "rotten bridge scandal" removed much of their clout even by 1924.

The bridge opened on May 28, 1926, at a final cost of $4.5 million (including approaches). It was the first Willamette River bridge in Portland designed with input from an architect.  This led to the Italian Renaissance towers and decorative metal railings.  The bascule system was designed by Joseph Strauss. The initial principal engineer for the bridge construction was the firm of Hedrick & Kremers. The bridge was then completed by Gustav Lindenthal, who also supervised its construction.

Streetcars crossed the Burnside Bridge until 1950, and electric trolleybuses serving the Sandy Blvd. route did so from 1936 to 1958.  Currently, three TriMet bus routes use the bridge.

In the 1990s the Burnside Bridge was made a Regional Emergency Transportation Route, the one non-freeway bridge to be used by emergency vehicles. In 1995 one of the six lanes was removed to accommodate new bicycle lanes.  From March until November 2002 the bridge went through a $2.1 million seismic retrofit, making it the first bridge operated by Multnomah County to receive earthquake protection.
 
The bridge was under construction in 2006 in order to replace the deck.  The electric streetcar tracks, abandoned in 1950, were visible during the construction.  This project was budgeted at $9 million and the majority of the work was completed on December 9, 2007. The bridge was added to the National Register of Historic Places in November 2012.

The Eastbank Esplanade, which opened in 2001, is connected to the bridge by stairs added during the esplanade's construction. However, because of the bridge's age, it cannot support any extra weight, so the stairways must be supported by separate pilings.

In 2020, the Earthquake Ready Burnside Bridge project deemed that the current short span bridge would not survive a major earthquake, and recommended a replacement long span bridge. The replacement is estimated to cost $825 million and begin construction in 2025.

In popular culture
Indie rock band the Mountain Goats prominently mention the Burnside Bridge in the lyrics of their 2012 song "Steal Smoked Fish".

See also
Joseph Strauss (engineer)
List of bascule bridges
List of bridges documented by the Historic American Engineering Record in Oregon
List of bridges on the National Register of Historic Places in Oregon
List of crossings of the Willamette River

References

External links

Burnside Bridge page on Multnomah County website

1926 establishments in Oregon
Bascule bridges in the United States
Bridges by Joseph Strauss (engineer)
Bridges completed in 1894
Bridges completed in 1926
Bridges in Portland, Oregon
Road bridges on the National Register of Historic Places in Oregon
Bridges over the Willamette River
Buckman, Portland, Oregon
Drawbridges on the National Register of Historic Places
Historic American Engineering Record in Oregon
National Register of Historic Places in Portland, Oregon
Northeast Portland, Oregon
Northwest Portland, Oregon
Old Town Chinatown
Southwest Portland, Oregon
Swing bridges in Oregon
U.S. Route 30
U.S. Route 99
Kerns, Portland, Oregon
Tom McCall Waterfront Park
Concrete bridges in the United States
Truss bridges in the United States
Metal bridges in the United States